The Municipality of Bled is a municipality in northwestern Slovenia in the Upper Carniola region. The seat of the municipality is the town of Bled, located on the shores of Lake Bled. The area is a popular tourist destination.

The Municipality of Bled was established in October 1994. It was greatly reduced in size with the establishment of the Municipality of Gorje in June 2006, because it has retained only 38% of its previous territory.

Settlements

In addition to the municipal seat of Bled, the municipality also includes the following settlements:

 Bodešče
 Bohinjska Bela
 Koritno
 Kupljenik
 Obrne
 Ribno
 Selo pri Bledu
 Slamniki
 Zasip

Notable people
Notable people that were born or lived in the Municipality of Bled include:
Iztok Čop (born 1972), rower, multiple Olympic medalist
Peter Florjančič (born 1919), inventor
Sara Isaković (born 1988), freestyle swimmer, Olympic medalist
Špela Pretnar (born 1973), skier, Olympic athlete
Julius von Payer (1841–1915), Arctic explorer, born in Šanov, Teplice
Denis Žvegelj (born 1972), rower, Olympic medalist

References

External links

Municipality of Bled on Geopedia
Bled municipal site (in Slovene)

 
Bled
1994 establishments in Slovenia